4-Aminoquinoline is a form of aminoquinoline with the amino group at the 4-position of the quinoline. The compound has been used as a precursor for the synthesis of its derivatives.

A variety of derivatives of 4-aminoquinoline are antimalarial agents useful in treating erythrocytic plasmodial infections. Examples include amodiaquine, chloroquine, and hydroxychloroquine. Other uses for the derivatives are: anti-asthmatic, antibacterial, anti-fungal, anti-malarial, antiviral and anti-inflammatory agents. 

A patent application for 4-aminoquinoline compounds was filed in 2002 and published in 2005.

See also
 Quinoline
 8-Hydroxyquinoline
 Ionophore

References

External links
 
"4-Aminoquinoline 578-68-7 | TCI America". www.tcichemicals.com. Retrieved 2020-03-06.

Quinolines